Beskow is a Swedish family of German origin, taking its name from the town of Beeskow in Prussia. The first member to settle in the Swedish realm was the tailor alderman Arendt Beskow (1718–1790) in Stralsund in what was then Swedish Pomerania.

Notable members of this family 

Bernhard von Beskow (1796–1868), poet, playwright, courtier, permanent secretary of the Swedish Academy, created a baron in 1843
Gustaf Emanuel Beskow (1834–1899), theologian and educator
Bernhard August Beskow (1837–1910), engraver
Natanael Beskow (1865–1953), theologian
Elsa Beskow (1874–1953), author and illustrator of children's books (married to Natanael B.)
Bo Beskow (1906–1988), painter (son of Elsa and Natanael B.)
Per Beskow (1926−2016), Swedish biblical scholar
Katarina Beskow (1867–1939), chess player
Emil Beskow (1998 -?), World champion

Other notable individuals with this surname 

Saskia Beskow, former New York City Ballet dancer

References
Svenskt biografiskt handlexikon

There are many U.S. Beskows who are not of Swedish descent. One group of German Beskows settled in South Dakota and were staunch anti-abolitionist store owners during the 1850s.

There are also US Beskows who are not of Swedish descent. One group of Norwegian Beskows settled in Wisconsin and still live there today.

Beskow
Swedish families of German ancestry